Tylenchorhynchus dubius is a plant pathogenic nematode.

References

External links 
Nemaplex, University of California - Tylenchorhynchus dubius

Agricultural pest nematodes
Tylenchida